Lavina Airport  is a public use airport located two nautical miles (4 km) northwest of the central business district of Lavina, a town in Golden Valley County, Montana, United States. It is owned by the State of Montana.

Facilities and aircraft 
Lavina Airport covers an area of 52 acres (21 ha) at an elevation of 3,490 feet (1,064 m) above mean sea level. It has one runway designated 7/25 with a turf surface measuring 3,460 by 100 feet (1,055 x 30 m). For the 12-month period ending August 5, 2008, the airport had 375 general aviation aircraft operations, an average of 31 per month.

References

External links 
 Aerial image as of August 1996 from USGS The National Map
 

Airports in Montana
Buildings and structures in Golden Valley County, Montana
Transportation in Golden Valley County, Montana